The 2015 Citi Open was a tennis tournament played on outdoor hard courts. It was the 47th edition (for the men) and the 5th edition (for the women) of the Washington Open. The event was part of the ATP World Tour 500 series of the 2015 ATP World Tour, and of the WTA International tournaments of the 2015 WTA Tour. It took place at the William H.G. FitzGerald Tennis Center in Washington, D.C., United States, from August 3 to August 9, 2015.

Points and prize money

Point distribution

Prize money 

1 Qualifiers prize money is also the Round of 64 prize money
* per team

ATP singles main-draw entrants

Seeds

1 Rankings are as of July 27, 2015

Other entrants
The following players received wild cards into the main singles draw:
  Tommy Haas 
  Lleyton Hewitt
  Nicolás Jarry 
  Denis Kudla

The following players received entry from the singles qualifying draw:
  Ryan Harrison
  Darian King 
  Marinko Matosevic
  Yoshihito Nishioka
  Guido Pella 
  John-Patrick Smith

The following player received entry as lucky loser:
  Ivan Dodig

Withdrawals
Before the tournament
  Marcos Baghdatis → replaced by  Ivan Dodig
  Thanasi Kokkinakis → replaced by  Go Soeda
  Adrian Mannarino → replaced by  Lukáš Lacko
  Janko Tipsarević → replaced by  Ričardas Berankis

ATP doubles main-draw entrants

Seeds

1 Rankings are as of July 27, 2015

Other entrants
The following pairs received wildcards into the doubles main draw:
  Sam Groth /  Lleyton Hewitt  
  Steve Johnson  /  Sam Querrey
The following pair received entry from the doubles qualifying draw:
   Austin Krajicek /  Nicholas Monroe
The following pair received entry as lucky loser:
   Treat Huey /  Scott Lipsky

Withdrawals
Before the tournament
   Pablo Cuevas (back injury)

WTA singles main-draw entrants

Seeds

1 Rankings are as of July 27, 2015

Other entrants
The following players received wild cards into the main singles draw:
  Louisa Chirico
  Taylor Townsend
  CoCo Vandeweghe

The following players received entry from the singles qualifying draw:
  Naomi Broady 
  Julia Glushko
  Sanaz Marand  
  An-Sophie Mestach

Withdrawals
Before the tournament
  Victoria Azarenka → replaced by  Polona Hercog
  Eugenie Bouchard → replaced by  Lauren Davis
  Sara Errani → replaced by  Irina Falconi
  Daniela Hantuchová → replaced by  Lara Arruabarrena

WTA doubles main-draw entrants

Seeds

1 Rankings are as of July 27, 2015

Other entrants
The following pair received a wildcard into the doubles main draw:
  Louisa Chirico /  Alizé Lim

Champions

Men's singles

  Kei Nishikori def.  John Isner, 4–6, 6–4, 6–4

Women's singles

   Sloane Stephens def.  Anastasia Pavlyuchenkova, 6–1, 6–2

Men's doubles

  Bob Bryan /  Mike Bryan def.  Ivan Dodig /  Marcelo Melo, 6–4, 6–2

Women's doubles

  Belinda Bencic /  Kristina Mladenovic def.  Lara Arruabarrena /  Andreja Klepač, 7–5, 7–6(9–7)

References

External links
Official website

2015 WTA Tour
2015 Citi
2015 in American tennis
2015 in sports in Washington, D.C.